Freewheelers is a British children's action / adventure television series made by Southern Television between 1968 and 1973. Each story centred around a group of teenagers who aid a British security agent to thwart the plans of a villain and avert an international disaster.

Series overview

Episodes

Each of the eight series comprised 13 x 30 minute episodes divided into two or three linked stories. All eight series were produced by Chris McMaster.

For extant episodes, the episode title and the names of director and writer are taken from the programme credits (except in the case of Chris McMaster who did not take a director credit). Information for the remaining episodes is from published sources, principally contemporary listings and Time Screen magazine articles and episode guides.  Air dates are from TV listings for the earliest broadcast, some ITV regions may have been later.

Under Status for the best known copy, "TR" indicates broadcast standard telerecording, "VT" indicates broadcast standard videotape, and "VHS" indicates the domestic recording format.

Series 1 (1968)

Series 2 (1968–69)

Series 3 (1969)

Series 4 (1970)

Series 5 (1971)

Series 6 (1971)

Series 7 (1972)

Series 8 (1973)

Archive status 

53 of the 104 episodes exist: 27 as broadcast masters, 14 as telerecordings and 12 in domestic formats (e.g. VHS). The remaining 51 episodes are missing.

The telerecordings include all 13 episodes of Series 1. The only series for which a complete set of video masters is held is Series 6, which was released on DVD in 2009.

The location film segments for all episodes are at Wessex Film and Sound Archive (collection AV763).

Notes

References

External links
 

Freewheelers
Freewheelers
Lost television episodes